Hatzegopteryx ("Hațeg basin wing") is a genus of azhdarchid pterosaur found in the late Maastrichtian deposits of the Densuş Ciula Formation, an outcropping in Transylvania, Romania. It is known only from the type species, Hatzegopteryx thambema, named by Buffetaut et al. in 2002 based on parts of the skull and humerus. Additional specimens, including a neck vertebra, were later placed in the genus, representing a range of sizes.

Hatzegopteryx inhabited Hațeg Island, an island situated in the Cretaceous subtropics within the prehistoric Tethys Sea. In the absence of large theropods, Hatzegopteryx was likely the apex predator of Hațeg Island, tackling proportionally larger prey (including dwarf titanosaurs and iguanodontians) than other azhdarchids.

Discovery and naming 
 
The first pterosaur remains from Romania were identified by Franz Nopcsa in 1899, and the first remains of Hatzegopteryx were found during a student dig during the late 1970s from the upper part of the Middle Densuş Ciula Formation of Vălioara, northwestern Hațeg Basin, Transylvania, western Romania, which has been dated to the late Maastrichtian stage of the Late Cretaceous Period, around 66 million years ago. The holotype of Hatzegopteryx, FGGUB R 1083A, consists of two fragments from the back of the skull and the damaged proximal part of a left humerus. One of these fragments, namely the occipital region, was initially referred to a theropod dinosaur when it was first announced in 1991. FGGUB R1625 would have belonged to a smaller individual of Hatzegopteryx (assuming it pertains to the genus), with a  wingspan. Additional reported specimens from the locality include an unpublished mandible, also from a large individual.

Hatzegopteryx was named in 2002 by French paleontologist Eric Buffetaut, and Romanian paleontologists Dan Grigorescu and Zoltan Csiki. The generic name is derived from the Hatzeg (or Hațeg) basin of Transylvania, where the bones were found, and from Greek pteryx (ἡ πτέρυξ, -υγος (also ἡ πτερύξ, -ῦγος), or 'wing'. The specific name thambema is derived from the Greek for 'terror, monster' (τό θάμβημα, -ήματος), in reference to its huge size.

New specimens of Hatzegopteryx have since been recovered from other localities. From the Râpa Roșie locality of the Sebeș Formation, which is contemporary and adjacent to the Densuș Ciula Formation, a single large neck vertebra, the "RR specimen" or EME 215, was found. Although the lack of overlapping elements prevents this specimen from being definitely referred to Hatzegopteryx thambema, its distinctive internal bone structure, as well as the lack of evidence for a second giant azhdarchid in the area, warrant its referral to at least H. sp.

Description

Skull 
The skull of Hatzegopteryx was gigantic, with an initially estimated length of  based on comparisons with Nyctosaurus and Anhanguera, making it one of the largest skulls among non-marine animals. While most pterosaur skulls are composed of gracile plates and struts, in Hatzegopteryx the skull bones are stout and robust, with large ridges indicating strong muscular attachments.

The massive jaw bore a distinctive groove at its point of articulation (also seen in some other pterosaurs, including Pteranodon) that would have allowed the animal to achieve a very wide gape. Unpublished remains attributed to Hatzegopteryx suggest that it had a proportionally short, deep beak, grouping with the "blunt-beaked" azhdarchids rather than the "slender-beaked" azhdarchids (including Quetzalcoatlus sp.).

Cervical vertebrae 
 
A large neck vertebra attributed to Hatzegopteryx is short and unusually robust. Meanwhile, the same vertebrae in the similarly giant Arambourgiania measured ; this indicates that the neck of Hatzegopteryx is about 50–60% the length of what would be expected for a giant azhdarchid of its size.

Although the neural spine of the vertebra is not completely preserved, the width of the preserved portion suggests that it was relatively tall and robust relative to those of other pterosaurs. Other aspects of the vertebra converge upon the seventh neck vertebra of the smaller Azhdarcho most closely: the articulating sockets (cotyles) are much shallower than the neural arches, and are four times as wide as they are tall; a process on the bottom of the vertebrae, known as a hypapophysis, is present; the processes at the front of the vertebrae, the prezygapophyses, are splayed; and the vertebra has a tapered "waist" in the middle of the centrum. Although initially identified as a third neck vertebra, these traits supports the identification of the vertebra as coming from the rear of the neck, more specifically as being the seventh vertebra.

Size 

The size of Hatzegopteryx was initially estimated by comparing the  humerus fragment with that of Quetzalcoatlus northropi, which has a -long humerus. Observing that the Hatzegopteryx fragment presented less than half of the original bone, Buffetaut et al. established that it could possibly have been "slightly longer" than that of Quetzalcoatlus. They concluded that an estimate of a  wing span for Hatzegopteryx was conservative, "provided that its humerus was longer than that of Q. northropi". In 2010, Mark Witton and Michael Habib concluded that Hatzegopteryx was probably no larger than Q. northropi in wingspan; the initial conclusions did not account for distortion of the bone.

It has been suggested, on the basis of the wide and robust neck vertebra referred to Hatzegopteryx, that the entire vertebral column of the animal was similarly expanded, increasing its overall size. However, this is likely not true, since the neck vertebrae of large pterodactyloids generally tend to be wider and larger than the rest of the vertebrae. Although estimates of pterosaur size based on vertebrae alone are not particularly reliable, the size of this vertebra is consistent with an animal that measured  in wingspan.

Classification 

Similarities between the humerus of Hatzegopteryx and Quetzalcoatlus northropi have been noted; both have a long, smooth deltopectoral crest, and a thickened humeral head. These were initially the basis of the taxon's referral to the clade Azhdarchidae, but they are also similar enough to be a basis for the synonymy of Hatzegopteryx and Quetzalcoatlus. However, this is likely due to the relatively non-diagnostic nature of the humerus in giant azhdarchid taxonomy, and the lack of a detailed description for the elements of Q. northropi. However, the neck and jaw anatomy of Hatzegopteryx is quite clearly distinct from the smaller Q. sp., which warrants the retention of Hatzegopteryx as a taxon separate from Quetzalcoatlus.

The neck vertebra referred to Hatzegopteryx sp. contains a number of traits that allow for it to be definitely identified as that of an azhdarchid. The centrum is relatively low, the zygapophyses are large and flattened, and the preserved portions of the neural spine indicate that it is bifid, or split into two. A phylogenetic analysis conducted by Nicholas Longrich and colleagues in 2018 had recovered Hatzegopteryx within the Azhdarchidae in a derived position, sister taxon to both Arambourgiania and Quetzalcoatlus. The cladogram of their analysis is presented below:

Paleobiology

Bone structure 
While the skull of Hatzegopteryx was unusually large and robust, its wing bones are comparable to those of other flying pterosaurs, indicating that it was not flightless. Buffetaut et al. suggested that, in order to fly, the skull weight of Hatzegopteryx must have been reduced in some way. The wing bones also bear a similar internal structure. This unusual construction differs from that of other pterosaurs, and resembles more closely the structure of expanded polystyrene (used to manufacture Styrofoam). This would have made the skull sturdy and stress-resistant, but also lightweight, enabling the animal to fly. A similar internal structure is also seen in the cervical vertebra referred to Hatzegopteryx.

Neck biomechanics 
 
As a consequence of its robust, thick-walled vertebrae, the neck of Hatzegopteryx was much stronger than that of Arambourgiania. While Arambourgiania'''s neck vertebrae fail at about half of its body weight, the posterior neck vertebrae of Hatzegopteryx can withstand anywhere between five to ten body weights, depending on the loading of the bone. Even the hypothetically longer anterior neck vertebrae of Hatzegopteryx would be able to withstand four to seven body weights.

Although the centrum of Hatzegopteryx is much more robust than Arambourgiania, their ratios of bone radius to bone thickness (R/t) are roughly the same (9.45 for Hatzegopteryx and 9.9 for Arambourgiania). This may represent a compromise between increasing bending strength and buckling strength; higher R/t ratios lead to improved bending strength, but weaker buckling strength. To compensate for this, Hatzegopteryx shows a number of other adaptations to improve buckling strength, namely the distinctive internal structures of the bones and the large articular joints of the vertebrae, the latter of which helps to distribute stress.

In order to support the robust head, the neck of Hatzegopteryx was likely strongly muscled. On the occipital bones, the nuchal lines, which serve as muscular attachments, are very well-developed and bear prominent scars. These conceivably supported the transversospinalis muscles, which aid in extension and flexion of the head and neck. Likewise, the opisthotic process, neural spines, and zygapophyses all appeared to have been large and robust (with the latter bearing many pits and edges that likely represent muscle scars), and the basioccipital tuberosities were long; these all serve as points of attachment for various muscles of the head and neck. Although not entirely unmuscled, the neck of Arambourgiania probably would not have been as extensively muscled as that of Hatzegopteryx.

 Paleoecology 
 
Like all azhdarchid pterosaurs, Hatzegopteryx was probably a terrestrially foraging generalist predator. It is significantly larger than any other terrestrial predator from Maastrichtian Europe; due to its large size in an environment otherwise dominated by island dwarf dinosaurs, with no large hypercarnivorous theropods in the region, it has been suggested that Hatzegopteryx played the role of an apex predator in the Hațeg Island ecosystem. The robust anatomy of Hatzegopteryx suggests that it may have tackled larger prey than other azhdarchids, including animals too large to swallow whole. Meanwhile, other giant azhdarchids like Arambourgiania would probably have instead fed on small prey (up to the size of a human), including hatchling or small dinosaurs and eggs. Another pterosaur, Thalassodromeus, has similarly been suggested to be raptorial.

Apart from Hatzegopteryx, there are various other unusual denizens of the Hațeg Island ecosystem. The robust, flightless, and possibly herbivorous avialan or dromaeosaurid Balaur, which had two enlarged claws on each foot, represents another highly specialized component of the fauna. The ecosystem contained a number of insular dwarfs, namely the titanosaurs Magyarosaurus and Paludititan, the hadrosaurid Telmatosaurus, and the iguanodontian Zalmoxes. Along with the nodosaurid Struthiosaurus, various small, fragmentary maniraptorans were present: Bradycneme, Elopteryx, and Heptasteornis. Crocodilian remains, belonging to the genera Allodaposuchus, Doratodon, and Acynodon have also been found. Non-archosaurian components include the kogaionid multituberculate mammals Kogaionon, Barbatodon, Litovoi tholocephalos, and Hainina; lizards such as the teiid Bicuspidon and the paramacellodid Becklesius; an unnamed madtsoiid snake; and the lissamphibians Albanerpeton, Eodiscoglossus, and Paradiscoglossus''.

During the Maastrichtian, southern Europe was an archipelago. The members of the Hațeg Island ecosystem lived on a landmass known as the Tisia–Dacia Block, of which the Hațeg Basin was a small part. The environment consisted of various alluvial plains, wetlands, and rivers, surrounded by woodlands dominated by ferns and angiosperms.

See also 
 List of pterosaur genera
 Timeline of pterosaur research
 Pterosaur size

References

External links 

Azhdarchids
Late Cretaceous pterosaurs of Europe
Geography of Transylvania
Maastrichtian life
Fossil taxa described in 2002
Hațeg fauna
Apex predators